Hedge End railway station is situated on the northern edge of the town of Hedge End in the English county of Hampshire. The station was opened by British Rail in 1990, and is on the railway line between Eastleigh and Fareham.

Services
South Western Railway operate all off-peak services at Hedge End using  and  EMUs.

The typical off-peak service in trains per hour is:
 1 tph to  via 
 1 tph to 

During the weekday peak hours, the service is increased to 2 tph.

This service is operated using  and  DMUs.

References

External links

Railway stations in Hampshire
DfT Category E stations
Railway stations opened by British Rail
Railway stations in Great Britain opened in 1990
Railway stations served by South Western Railway
Railway stations served by Great Western Railway